Felicioliva peruviana, common name the Peruvian olive, is a species of sea snail, a marine gastropod mollusk in the family Olividae, the olives. This species occurs in the Pacific Ocean from Peru to Southern Chile (not in the Galapagos Islands)

References

External links
 Gastropods.com: Oliva (Strephona) peruviana

Olividae
Gastropods described in 1811